Andrew Simon an American clarinettist, is the principal clarinet of the Hong Kong Philharmonic Orchestra.

He made his debut in the Carnegie Hall Recital (Weill) Hall in 1989, after winning the Artists International Young Musicians Auditions Clarinet Award.

He is noted as one of the few clarinettists that have been performing the original 1948 version of the Copland Clarinet Concerto. It was with this concerto that he made his Australian concerto debut in 2000, giving the Australian premiere of the original version of Copland's Clarinet Concerto with Marin Alsop.

References 

Birthday: February 17, 1963

Discography

External links
 Andrew Simon web site

Living people
American classical clarinetists
21st-century clarinetists
Year of birth missing (living people)